Raymond Henry St. Arnaud (born June 24, 1942, in Edmonton, Alberta) is a Canadian photographer.

Work
St. Arnaud would often take on jobs for a few months at a time, then leave and use the money he had earned to pursue his next photography project. At one point in his life, he left his job to take a series of landscape photos – fifteen of which ended up in Canada's National Gallery.

When he moved to Victoria, British Columbia, he started working for Camosun College on a temporary basis and stayed for 20 years.

In December 2010, he was included in the PrintedArt collection and has since then been one of its most prolific artists.

Exhibitions and publications

Notable solo exhibitions
 Outside the Box solo exhibitions in Reno, NV and Dublin, OH
 Helen Smith Gallery in Auburn Washington
 Southern Light Gallery in Amarillo
 3-day sale on GILT.com

Group exhibitions
 SigGraph 2003
  at Art Institute of California, San Diego. Two simultaneous exhibitions from September 1 to October 1, 2011
 Theater of the Mind 2002
 Eye Appeal
 Homage
 Beecher Center Digital Art Competition 2001
 Art Incognito
 ASCI Digital 2002

Books
 Secrets from the museums of Paris
 Random Walks
 Sortie ... the Running Man
 27 after 25
 As Seen On TV
 Outside the Box
 Reflections: The Pre-Millennium Landscapes
 Visit to a Surrey Townhouse
 The Forced March
 The Dysfunctional Photographer
 The Amdahl Graphics
 Solo Artist's First Flight
 Island Illustrators
 Frank Gurney ... engraver
 Evenlyn de R. McMann: Biographical Index of Artists in Canada (University of Toronto)

Other publications
 The Island Illustrator Society...25th anniversary...68 studio visits
 Digital Art Guild
 Opus Framing & Art
 New Trail (University of Alberta)
 Will the Real Alberta Please Stand Up (in New Trail)

References

External links
   National Gallery of Canada
   Raymond St. Arnaud's Photography Website
   Series of Exhibitions in 2001
   Outside the Box Exhibition in Reno, NV
   MetaLphor Exhibition, San Diego 2011
   Focus Magazine
   Raymond St. Arnaud's Poetry
   Raymond St. Arnaud's Dysfunctional Photographer Blog
   The Force March Blog

1942 births
Artists from Edmonton
Canadian photographers
Living people
Academic staff of Camosun College